Owen Drake (1936 – June 27, 2011) was an American Republican politician.

A veteran of the United States Air Force, Drake served in the Alabama House of Representatives from 2006 until his death.

Notes

Republican Party members of the Alabama House of Representatives
1936 births
2011 deaths